Davide Cinzi is an Italian cinematographer.

Early life and education 
Cinzi graduated from the Surrey Institute of Art and Design (SIAD) with a BA degree in "Film and Video" (now the University for the Creative Arts).  He earned an MA degree in "Cinematography" from the National Film and Television School (NFTS).

Selected filmography 
 Photos of God, 2009
 The Confession, 2009

Awards and nominations

External links 
  
 

1983 births
Living people
British cinematographers
Italian cinematographers
Alumni of the National Film and Television School